Baiji Sport Club is an Iraqi football team based in Saladin, that plays in Iraq Division Two.

Stadium
In August 2021, the Ministry of Youth and Sports decided to restore and rehabilitate Baiji Stadium, after it had been destroyed by ISIS in previous years.

Managerial history
  Mahmoud Saadoun

Famous players
Raad Fanar

See also
 2000–01 Iraqi Elite League 
 2021–22 Iraq Division Two

References

External links
 Iraq Clubs- Foundation Dates

1988 establishments in Iraq
Association football clubs established in 1988
Football clubs in Saladin